The 1926 World Fencing Championships were held in Budapest, Hungary, and Ostend, Belgium.

Medal summary

Men's events

References

1926 in Belgian sport
1926 in Hungarian sport
International fencing competitions hosted by Belgium
International fencing competitions hosted by Hungary
World Fencing Championships